Zone Music Reporter (formerly New Age Reporter) is a website tracking New Age, world, and instrumental music.  The site features weekly playlist, monthly airplay charts, and album reviews.  Premium services are also offered to artists and their management compiling custom airplay reports for that artist.

Awards

Past winners
The Zone Music Reporter sponsors the yearly ZMR Awards yearly (Formerly the NAR LifeStyle Music Awards) since 2004.  Past winners include Marc Enfroy, Paul Adams, Michael Dulin, Jeff Oster, Bill Leslie, Jeff Pearce, Áine Minogue, Peter Kater, Will Ackerman, Starr Parodi, Ricky Kej, Al Conti, Michael DeMaria, Darlene Koldenhoven, Sangeeta Kaur, Aomusic, Kerani, Fiona Joy, and Amethystium.

Categories
 Album of the Year
 Best Ambient Album
 Best Celtic Album
 Best Contemporary Instrumental Album
 Best Cover Art
 Best Dance/Dub/Club Album
 Best Electronic Album
 Best Groove / Chill Album
 Best Holiday Album
 Best Instrumental Album (Acoustic)
 Best Instrumental Album (Piano)
 Best Native American Album
 Best Neo-Classical Album
 Best New Artist
 Best Piano Album - Solo
 Best Piano Album - with Instrumentation
 Best Relaxation/Meditation Album
 Best Vocal Album
 Best World Album

References

External links
 

American record charts